There are over 9,000 Grade I listed buildings and 20,000 Grade II* listed buildings in England. This page is a list of these buildings in the London Borough of Hillingdon.

Grade I

|}

Grade II*

|}

See also
 Grade II listed buildings in the London Borough of Hillingdon

Notes

External links
 
 

Lists of Grade I listed buildings in London
Lists of Grade II* listed buildings in London